All Saints High School may refer to:

Canada 
All Saints Catholic High School (Ontario)
All Saints Catholic Secondary School, Whitby, Ontario
All Saints High School (Calgary)

India 
All Saints High School (Andhra Pradesh), Hyderabad

Malaysia 
All Saints Secondary School, Kota Kinabalu, Sabah

United Kingdom 
All Saints' Catholic High School, Rawtenstall, Rawtenstall
All Saints Catholic High School, Sheffield, South Yorkshire
All Saints RC Secondary, Glasgow
All Saints Catholic High School, Kirkby, Merseyside, England

United States 
All Saints High School (Detroit, Michigan)
All Saints High School, a former high school in Washington, D.C., merged into Archbishop Carroll High School in 1989

See also
 All Saints School (disambiguation)